Collected Stories is a collection of 67 of Frank O'Connor's best-known short stories, first published in 1981.

The introduction to the collection was written by celebrated literary critic Richard Ellmann.

O'Connor expert Michael A. Steinman has pointed out that this collection is really "more 'selected' than 'collected'" since "it [only] contains one-third of O'Connor's stories".

Contents 
The collection contains among others the following stories:

 Christmas Morning
 The Bridal Night
 The Luceys
 Guests of the Nation
 The Late Henry Conran
 The Grand Viziers Daughters
 The Long Road to Ummera
 Song Without Words

References

1981 short story collections
Short story collections by Frank O'Connor
Alfred A. Knopf books